New Sounds: A Listener's Guide to New Music is a book written by radio show host John Schaefer. It is a guide that covers a range of subjects and genres relating to music. It has been referenced by many other books relating to the subjects and aspects of music.

Background
Schaefer discusses the categories of music. Discographies of the artists covered in the categories are provided. Dick Weissman referred to it as a "rich guide to many musical styles" in his book, The Music Business: Career Opportunities and Self-Defense.

Authors such as Leigh Landy with Experimental Music Notebooks, Karin Pendle and Melinda Boyd with their book Women in Music: A Research and Information Guide, and Jeremy Grimshaw with Draw a Straight Line and Follow It: The Music and Mysticism of La Monte Young have drawn on it.

Its original publication  was by Harper & Row in 1987.

Artists and composers covered
Joseph Schwantner, Brian Eno, Laurie Anderson and Frank Zappa are looked at.

About the author
Schaefer is currently the host of culture and talk show Soundcheck which is broadcast on Radio WNYC. He also hosts New Sounds, a radio program. He has produced New Sounds since 1982 and Soundcheck from its beginning in 2002.

References

1987 non-fiction books
American non-fiction books
Music guides